Mitchell James Ryan Davey (born 22 March 1990, in Ayr, Queensland) is former motorcycle speedway rider from Australia.

Career
Davey first rode in the British leagues for Glasgow Tigers during the 2008 Premier League speedway season.

In 2018, he was made captain of Birmingham Brummies during the 2018 National League speedway season but suffered a serious crash at the start of the season in May.

After six months recovering from vertebrae damage, a punctured lung, a broken shoulder blade and multiple broken ribs, he retired at the end of the 2018 season.

Speedway Achievements
2016: National League Winner (Guested for Birmingham in Grand Final)
2016: Knock Out Cup Finalist (Guested for Glasgow)
2016: 1st Maximum, Stoke (Guest) vs Buxton 15/10/16
2016: 1st Paid Maximum, Birmingham (Guest) vs Isle of Wight 31/8/16
 
2009: Queensland U/21 Title – 2nd
2009: Queensland Title – 4th

2008: Queensland Title – 4th
2008: Queensland U/21 Title – 4th
2008: Australian U/21 Title – 6th

2007: Australian U/21 Solo Title – 14th
2007: Queensland 500cc Solo Titles – 2nd place

2005: Queensland 125cc Solo Titles – 3rd place

2004: Queensland 125cc Solo Titles – 4th place

Long Track Achievements
2006: Queensland Long Track Titles – 1st (250cc) 3rd (125cc) 4th (450cc)

2005: Australian Long Track Titles – 2nd (85cc) 2nd (100cc) 4th (250cc) 5th (125cc)
2005: Queensland Long Track Titles – 1st (100cc)

2004: Australian Long Track Titles – 4th (85cc)
2004: Queensland Long Track Titles – 1st (85cc) 3rd (100cc)

2003: Australian Long Track Titles – 3rd (85cc) 4th (100cc)
2003: Queensland Long Track Titles – 1st (85cc)

2002: Queensland Long Track Titles – 1st (85cc) 2nd (100cc)

1998: Queensland Long Track Titles  - 1st (50cc)

Dirt Track Titles
2005 North Queensland Dirt Track Series – 2nd (250cc)
2005 Queensland Dirt Track Titles – 1st (85cc) 3rd (100cc)

2004 North Queensland Dirt Track Series – 1st (85cc) 1st (125cc)

2003 Queensland Dirt Track Titles -  1st (85cc)
2003 North Queensland Dirt Track Series – 1st (85cc)

References

1990 births
Living people
Australian speedway riders
Swindon Robins riders
Birmingham Brummies riders
Edinburgh Monarchs riders